Semioptila is a genus of moths in the family Himantopteridae.

Species
 Semioptila ansorgei Rothschild, 1907
 Semioptila axine Hering, 1937
 Semioptila banghaasi Hering, 1937
 Semioptila brachyura Hering, 1937
 Semioptila brevicauda Hering, 1937
 Semioptila constans Hering, 1937
 Semioptila dolicholoba Hampson, 1919
 Semioptila flavidiscata Hamson, 1910
 Semioptila fulveolans Mabille, 1897
 Semioptila hedydipna Kiriakoff, 1954
 Semioptila hilaris Rebel, 1906
 Semioptila hyalina Talbot, 1926
 Semioptila latifulva Hampson, 1919
 Semioptila longipennis Hering, 1937
 Semioptila lufirensis Joicey & Talbot, 1921
 Semioptila lydia Weymer, 1908
 Semioptila macrodipteryx Kiriakoff, 1954
 Semioptila marshalli Rothschild, 1907
 Semioptila monochroma Hering, 1932
 Semioptila opaca Hering, 1937
 Semioptila overlaeti Hering, 1937
 Semioptila papilionaria Walker, 1864
 Semioptila psalidoprocne Kiriakoff, 1954
 Semioptila satanas Hering, 1937
 Semioptila semiflava Talbot, 1928
 Semioptila seminigra Talbot, 1928
 Semioptila spatulipennis Hering, 1937
 Semioptila splendida Hering, 1937
 Semioptila stenopteryx Hering, 1932
 Semioptila torta Butler, 1877
 Semioptila trogoloba Hampson, 1919
 Semioptila ursula Hering, 1937
 Semioptila vinculum Hering, 1937

References

Himantopteridae
Zygaenoidea genera